Lita Gaithers (born July 30, 1956) is an American singer-songwriter, actress, director, and Tony Award-nominated co-author and vocal director of the Broadway musical It Ain't Nothin' But the Blues, which was nominated for 4 Tony Awards including Best Musical in 1999. Lita, who received a nomination for the Tony Award for Best Book of a Musical, is the third of only four African American women who have ever been nominated in that category.

As a veteran performer of legitimate stages that include: the Mark Taper Forum, Pasadena Playhouse, and Arena Stage, her lead and featured stage performances consist of: The Tin Pan Alley Rag, Ain't Misbehavin', Nunsense, The Best Little Whorehouse in Texas, A... My Name Is Alice, Purlie, For Colored Girls Who Have Considered Suicide / When the Rainbow Is Enuf, and being an original cast member of Blues, which was developed at the Denver Center Theatre Company.

Lita is married to the Reverend Dr. Oscar Otis Owens, Jr., and resides in View Park-Windsor Hills, California.

References

External links 

African-American women singer-songwriters
American musical theatre actresses
Living people
African-American actresses
American stage actresses
1956 births
21st-century African-American people
21st-century African-American women
20th-century African-American people
20th-century African-American women